Viljo Viklund (1 May 1903 – 17 March 1971) was a Finnish swimmer. He competed in the men's 200 metre breaststroke event at the 1924 Summer Olympics.

References

External links
 

1903 births
1971 deaths
Finnish male breaststroke swimmers
Olympic swimmers of Finland
Swimmers at the 1924 Summer Olympics
Sportspeople from Tampere
20th-century Finnish people